In Gallo-Roman religion,  Epona was a protector of horses, ponies, donkeys, and mules. She was particularly a goddess of fertility, as shown by her attributes of a patera, cornucopia, ears of grain, and the presence of foals in some sculptures. She and her horses might also have been leaders of the soul in the after-life ride, with later literary parallels in Rhiannon of the Mabinogion. The worship of Epona, "the sole Celtic divinity ultimately worshipped in Rome itself", as the patroness of cavalry, was widespread in the Roman Empire between the first and third centuries AD; this is unusual for a Celtic deity, most of whom were associated with specific localities.

Etymology
Although known only from Roman contexts, the name Epona ('Great Mare') is from the Gaulish language; it is derived from the inferred Proto-Celtic *ekʷos 'horse', which gives rise to modern Welsh ebol 'foal', together with the augmentative suffix -on frequently, although not exclusively, found in theonyms (for example Sirona, Matrona) and the usual Gaulish feminine singular -a. In an episode preserved in a remark of Pausanias, an archaic  Demeter Erinys (Vengeful Demeter) too had also been a Great Mare, who was mounted by Poseidon in the form of a stallion and foaled Arion and the Daughter who was unnamed outside the Arcadian mysteries. Demeter was venerated as a mare in Lycosoura in Arcadia into historical times.

Evidence

Fernand Benoît found the earliest attestations of a cult of Epona in the Danubian provinces and asserted that she had been introduced in the limes of Gaul by horsemen from the east. That suggestion has not been generally taken up.
 
Although the name is Gaulish, dedicatory inscriptions to Epona are in Latin or, rarely, Greek. They were made not only by Celts, but also by Germans, Romans, and other inhabitants of the Roman Empire. An inscription to Epona from Mainz, Germany, identifies the dedicator as Syrian.

A long Latin inscription of the first century BC, engraved in a lead sheet and accompanying the sacrifice of a filly and the votive gift of a cauldron, was found in 1887 at Rom, Deux-Sèvres, the Roman Rauranum. Olmsted reads the inscription as invoking the goddess with an archaic profusion of epithets: Eponina 'dear little Epona', Atanta 'horse-goddess', Potia 'powerful Mistress' (compare Greek Potnia), Dibonia (Latin, the 'good goddess')", Catona 'of battle', noble and good Vovesia. However, Olmsted's interpretation has not been generally accepted by other scholars; Meid interprets the same inscription as an invocation of Dibona in vulgar Greek for aid in a romantic dispute.

Epona's feast day in the Roman calendar was given as December 18 on a rustic calendar from Guidizzolo, Italy, although this may have been only a local celebration. She was incorporated into the imperial cult by being invoked on behalf of the Emperor, as Epona Augusta or Epona Regina.

The supposed autonomy of Celtic civilization in Gaul suffered a further setback with Fernand Benoît's study of the funereal symbolism of the horseman with the serpent-tailed ("anguiforme") daemon, which he established as a theme of victory over death, and Epona; both he found to be late manifestations of Mediterranean-influenced symbolism, which had reached Gaul through contacts with Etruria and Magna Graecia. Benoît compared the rider with most of the riders imaged around the Mediterranean shores.

Perceptions of native Celtic goddesses had changed under Roman hegemony: only the names remained the same. As Gaul was Romanized under the early Empire, Epona’s sovereign role evolved into a protector of cavalry. The cult of Epona was spread over much of the Roman Empire by the auxiliary cavalry, alae, especially the Imperial Horse Guard or equites singulares augustii recruited from Gaul, Lower Germany, and Pannonia. A series of their dedications to Epona and other Celtic, Roman, and German deities was found in Rome, at the Lateran. Her cult is said to have been "widespread also in Carinthia and Styria".

As Epane she is attested in Cantabria, northern Spain, on Mount Bernorio, Palencia; as Iccona Loiminna in  Portugal on the Lusitanian inscription of Cabeço das Fráguas.

A euhemeristic account of Epona's origin occurs in the Parallela Minora, which were traditionally attributed to Plutarch (but are now classed as "Pseudo-Plutarch"):

Fulvius Stellus hated women and used to consort with a mare and in due time the mare gave birth to a beautiful girl and they named her Epona. She is the goddess that is concerned with the protection of horses. So Agesilaüs in the third book of his Italian History.
The tale was passed along in the context of unseemly man-beast coupling in Giambattista Della Porta's edition of Magia naturalis (1589), a potpourri of the sensible and questionable, erroneously citing Plutarch's Life of Solon. It may represent some recollection of  Indo-European horse sacrifice, such as the Vedic ashvamedha and the Irish ritual described by Giraldus Cambrensis, both of which have to do with kingship. In the Celtic ritual, the king mates with a white mare thought to embody the goddess of sovereignty.

Iconography

Sculptures of Epona fall into five types, as distinguished by Benoît: riding, standing or seated before a horse, standing or seated between two horses, a tamer of horses in the manner of potnia theron, and the symbolic mare and foal. In the Equestrian type, common in Gaul, she is depicted sitting side-saddle on a horse or (rarely) lying on one; in the Imperial type (more common outside Gaul) she sits on a throne flanked by two or more horses or foals. In distant Dacia, she is represented on a stela (now at the Szépmüvézeti Museum, Budapest) in the format of Cybele, seated frontally on a throne with her hands on the necks of her paired animals: her horses are substitutions for Cybele's lions.

In literature and art
Epona is mentioned in The Golden Ass by Apuleius, where an aedicular niche with her image on a pillar in a stable has been garlanded with freshly picked roses.

In his Satires, the Roman poet Juvenal also links the worship and iconography of Epona to the area of a stable. Small images of Epona have been found in Roman sites of stables and barns over a wide territory.

Epona is indirectly referenced in Victor Hugo's Les Misérables through the name of the character  Éponine.

In The Legend of Zelda franchise, the main character Link’s horse is named Epona. The horse is always shown as a brown or chestnut mare with a white mane.

Artist Enya's namesake album of 1987 contains a track titled Epona, as part of the soundtrack of the BBC documentary The Celts.<ref>Enya at Discogs.</ref>

In Britain
The probable date of c. 1380–550 BC ascribed to the giant chalk horse carved into the hillside turf at Uffington, in southern England, may be too early to be directly associated with Epona and may not actually represent a horse at all. The West Country traditional hobby-horse riders parading on May Day at Padstow, Cornwall and Minehead, Somerset, which survived to the mid-20th century, despite Morris dances having been forgotten, was thought by folklorists through the 20th Century to have deep roots in the veneration of Epona, as may the British aversion to eating horsemeat. At Padstow, at the end of the festivities, the hobby-horse was formerly ritually submerged in the sea. However, there is no firm evidence of the festival before the 18th century.

A provincial, small (7.5 cm high) Roman bronze of a seated Epona, flanked by an "extremely small" mare and stallion, was found in England. Lying on her lap and on the patera raised in her right hand are disproportionately large ears of grain; ears of grain also protrude from the mouths of the ponies, whose heads are turned toward the goddess. On her left arm she holds a yoke, which curves up above her shoulder, an attribute unique to this bronze statuette.

In the medieval Welsh collection of stories known as the Mabinogion, the regal figure of Rhiannon rides a white horse, whose slow, effortless gait supernaturally outpaces all pursuit. Wrongly accused of killing her offspring, Rhiannon has to play the role of horse for seven years as punishment, offering to carry travellers to the court and telling them her story; she also wears the work-collar of an ass. She and her son, who is fathered by the sea-god (cf Romano-Greek Poseidon, god of horses and the sea), are sometimes described as mare and foal Ronald Hutton is skeptical of connections claimed between Epona and Rhiannon; the latter is a much later, literary creation, though it also draws on oral traditions now lost. A south Welsh folk ritual called Mari Lwyd (Grey Mare) is still undertaken in December, which some folklorists likewise have held up as an apparent survival of the veneration of Epona, but again there is no firm evidence to support the age, origins or purpose of the practice.

Today
On Mackinac Island, Michigan, Epona is celebrated each June with stable tours, a blessing of the animals and the Epona and Barkus Parade. Mackinac Island does not permit personal automobiles; the primary source of transportation remains the horse, so celebrating Epona has special significance on this island in the upper midwest. The "Feast of Epona" involves the blessing of horses and other animals by a local churchman.

Epona is also worshipped today by neo-druids and other pagans and polytheists.

See also

 Horse sacrifice
 White horse (mythology)

Notes

References

 Benoît, F. (1950). Les mythes de l'outre-tombe. Le cavalier à l'anguipède et l'écuyère Épona. Brussels, Latomus Revue d'études latines.
 Delamarre, X. (2003). Dictionnaire de la langue gauloise. 2nd edition. Paris, Editions Errance.
 Euskirchen, Marion (1993). "Epona" Dissertation, Bonn 1994 (Sonderdruck aus: Bericht der Römisch-Germanischen Kommission 74.1993.)
 Evans, Dyfed Llwyd (2005–2007), Epona: a Gaulish and Brythonic goddess (Divine Horse)
 Green M. J. (1986), The Gods of the Celts, Stroud, Gloucestershire.
 Magnen, R. Epona (Delmas, 1953).
 Nantonos and Ceffyl (2004), Epona.net, a scholarly resource
 Oaks, L. S. (1986), "The goddess Epona", in M. Henig and A. King, Pagan Gods and Shrines of the Roman Empire (Oxford), pp 77–84.
 Reinach, Salomon (1895). "Épona". Revue archéologique 1895,  163–95,
 Simón, Francisco Marco, "Religion and Religious Practices of the Ancient Celts of the Iberian Peninsula" in e-Keltoi: The Celts in the Iberian Peninsula, 6 287–345, section 2.2.4.1 (online)
 Speidel, M. P. (1994). Riding for Caesar: the Roman Emperors' Horse Guards. Cambridge, Massachusetts, Harvard University Press.
 Thevenot, Emile 1949. "Les monuments et le culte d' Epona chez les Eduens," L'antiquité Classique 18 pp 385–400. Epona and the Aedui.
 Vaillant, Roger (1951), Epona-Rigatona, Ogam, Rennes, pp 190–205.

Further reading

 
 
 
 Waddell, John. "The Ancestors of Epona." In: Myth and Materiality'', 124-46. Oxford; Philadelphia: Oxbow Books, 2018. The Ancestors of Epona.
 .

Gaulish goddesses
Goddesses of the ancient Britons
Roman goddesses
Fertility goddesses
Animal goddesses
Horse deities
Donkey deities